Studenec (in older sources also Prudorf or Prudof) is a small settlement west of Trebnje in eastern Slovenia. The Municipality of Trebnje is included in the Southeast Slovenia Statistical Region. The entire area is part of the historical region of Lower Carniola.

History
The area was settled by German colonists in the 14th century and named Brunndorf (literally, 'spring village') because of the many springs in the area. Locally, the settlement is still known as Prudof.

References

External links
Studenec at Geopedia

Populated places in the Municipality of Trebnje